Protean is the adjectival form of the Greek sea-god name Proteus.

Protean may also refer to:

 Proteans (body language), involuntary flirting signals in humans
 Protean Electric, U.S. in-wheel electric motor company